Przystronie may refer to the following places in Poland:
Przystronie, Lower Silesian Voivodeship (south-west Poland)
Przystronie, Greater Poland Voivodeship (west-central Poland)